Kachalla Sembe is a ward in Taraba state of Nigeria, exisiing in Jalingo Local Government Area.

References 

Local Government Areas in Taraba State